This is a list of subgenres of jazz music.

See also

References

 
Jazz
Genres